Perinton (originally Perrinton (in federal censuses) and sometimes Perrington when still part of Ontario County) is a town in Monroe County, New York, United States. The population was 46,462 at the 2010 census.

The village of Fairport is within the town on the Erie Canal. Perinton is adjacent to the coterminous town and village of East Rochester (west), and the towns of Victor (south), Macedon (east), Pittsford (west), and Penfield (north). The hamlet of Egypt is in southeastern Perinton. Egypt Fire Department, Lollypop Farm, and Egypt Park are major Egypt landmarks. The southwestern portion of Perinton is called Bushnell's Basin and is home to the Bushnell's Basin Fire Department, Hitching Post Plaza, and Richardson's Canal House.

History
In 1788, Oliver Phelps and Nathaniel Gorham purchased 2.6 million acres (11,000 km²) of land in the wilderness of Western New York. William Walker of Canandaigua purchased  of the land and hired his brother Caleb and his cousin Glover Perrin (1762-1830) to survey and divide the land into 66 equal lots. The area was known as Township 12, Range 4, in the governmental unit of Northfield.

In 1793, Glover Perrin, his family, and his six siblings and their families, became the first permanent white settlers in the area. They settled in the flat and well-watered areas, specifically in the hamlet of Egypt (along the current Route 31) and Perinton Center (the intersection of Turk Hill and Ayrault roads). Early commercial ventures included mills, blacksmith shops, taverns, and inns.

By the late 1820s, the village of Fairport, located within the town on the Erie Canal, was becoming a booming canal town. Fairport, however, was not incorporated as a village until 1867.

From the 1850s to the 1950s, Perinton's history was primarily Fairport's history. The village was an active canal port and also a booming industrial town, echoing a trend that was occurring nationwide. As a result of the availability of cheap and easy transportation, which by the 1850s included the railroad as well as the canal, companies such as the DeLand Chemical Company, the Cobb Preserving Company, Taylor's Oil of Life, and eventually the American Can Company, grew and thrived. Services, including a fire department, a public library, street lighting, and parks, enhanced the life of the town and village. Residential areas, with homes built in a variety of architectural styles, were built around the bustling village center.

The town of Perinton, outside of Fairport, remained essentially rural until the 1950s. Today farms still exist in Perinton, but are surrounded by suburban subdivisions, office and industrial parks, and an impressive number of parks and open spaces. The village of Fairport still maintains the ambience of a canal town and capitalizes on the recreational aspects of that canal.

Most residents of the town of Perinton reside within both the Fairport Central School District and the Fairport postal district; due to this it is common for Perinton residents to describe their place of residence as "Fairport" even if they live outside of the village.

The town of Perinton was named one of the nation's 100 best places to live in 2008 by RelocateAmerica.com.

The Richardson's Tavern was listed on the National Register of Historic Places in 1980.

Parks and recreation
The town was recognized with the designation "Trail Town USA" by the American Hiking Society and often bills itself as such in public displays.  Among other hiking areas, the town includes the Crescent Trail, a 35-mile (56.3 km) system of footpaths through both public and private land.

Parks and recreational areas in the town include:

Beechwoods Park: hiking trail 
Egypt Park: baseball, tennis, playground
Fellows Road Park: tennis, volleyball, basketball, baseball, playground, exercise trail, indoor space for rent
Garnsey Arboretum: hiking, nature trail
Horizon Hill: indoor space and small pavilion
Indian Hill: hiking
Kreag Road Park: baseball, basketball, tennis, playground, canal access, outdoor shelter
Perinton Park: rowing boathouse, basketball, tennis, volleyball, playground, hiking trail, canal access, indoor space for rent
Perinton Recreation Center: soccer, bandshell, playground, hiking trail
Potter Park: soccer, baseball, tennis, teen center, skating rink
Powder Mills Park: downhill skiing, cross-country skiing, fishing, playground, hiking, fish hatchery
Spring Lake Park: fishing, baseball
White Brook Nature Area

Geography

Demographics

As of the census of 2000, there were 46,090 people, 17,591 households, and 12,964 families residing in the town.  The population density was 1,350.6 people per square mile (521.4/km2).  There were 18,041 housing units at an average density of 528.6 per square mile (204.1/km2).  The racial makeup of the town was 93.90% White, 1.72% African American, 0.11% Native American, 2.84% Asian, 0.01% Pacific Islander, 0.45% from other races, and 0.97% from two or more races. Hispanic or Latino of any race were 1.43% of the population.

There were 17,591 households, out of which 36.4% had children under the age of 18 living with them, 64.4% were married couples living together, 7.1% had a female householder with no husband present, and 26.3% were non-families. 21.7% of all households were made up of individuals, and 7.5% had someone living alone who was 65 years of age or older.  The average household size was 2.59 and the average family size was 3.06.

In the town, the population was spread out, with 26.7% under the age of 18, 5.0% from 18 to 24, 28.5% from 25 to 44, 28.1% from 45 to 64, and 11.6% who were 65 years of age or older.  The median age was 39 years. For every 100 females, there were 93.1 males.  For every 100 females age 18 and over, there were 89.2 males.

The median income for a household in the town was $69,341, and the median income for a family was $80,606. Males had a median income of $60,587 versus $36,113 for females. The per capita income for the town was $31,948.  About 1.8% of families and 2.9% of the population were below the poverty line, including 2.8% of those under age 18 and 3.4% of those age 65 or over.

Economy 
One of the major companies in Perinton is PAETEC.

Emergency response in Perinton 
Access to emergency services is obtained by dialing 9-1-1, which connects to the city of Rochester's Emergency Communications Department  Center). For the town of Perinton, the Monroe County Sheriff's Department provides primary law enforcement for the town's residents with the exception of the village of Fairport, which has its own police department.

For fire protection services, the town is divided into four districts:

Bushnell's Basin Fire Protection District (Bushnell's Basin Fire Department)
Egypt Fire Protection District (Egypt Fire Department)
Forest Hills Fire Protection District (East Rochester Fire Department)
Perinton Fire Protection District (Fairport Fire Department)

Each of the fire departments is staffed by volunteers and provide 24x7 fire protection, rescue and non-transport emergency medical services to the town's residents and visitors.

Primary emergency medical response is provided by Perinton Ambulance, which provides Advanced Life Support by trained Paramedics 24x7.

Communities and locations in Perinton 
Bushnell's Basin – a hamlet in the southwestern part of the town on NY 96.
Egypt – a hamlet in the eastern part of the town on NY 31.
East Rochester - The eastern part of the town/village of East Rochester is near the western town line on Route 31F.
Fairport – the village of Fairport is in the northwestern portion of the town at the junction of NY 31F and NY 250.
Fullam's Corners - a hamlet on O'Connor Road, Route 31F and Jefferson Avenue, east of Fairport village.
Hannans Corner - a hamlet at the intersection of NY 250 and NY 31 (Palmyra Road).
Perinton Square Mall - a shopping mall located west of Hannans Corner, on NY 31.

References

External links
 
 Fairport/Perinton Chamber of Commerce
 Fairport Public Library
 Historical and Statistical Gazetteer of New York State  by J. H. French (1860)

 
Rochester metropolitan area, New York
1812 establishments in New York (state)
Populated places established in 1812